Stephan Baeck (born 12 April 1965) is a German former basketball player. He competed in the men's tournament at the 1992 Summer Olympics. He won the gold medal at the EuroBasket 1993.

References

External links
 

1965 births
Living people
RheinStars Köln coaches
German men's basketball players
Olympic basketball players of Germany
Basketball players at the 1992 Summer Olympics
BSC Saturn Köln players
Alba Berlin players
Bayer Giants Leverkusen players
Sportspeople from Cologne
P.A.O.K. BC players